Stan Smith was the defending champion, but lost in the quarterfinals this year.

Tom Gorman won the title, defeating Björn Borg 6–3, 4–6, 7–6 in the final.

Seeds

  Stan Smith (quarterfinals)
  Ilie Năstase (third round)

Draw

Finals

Top half

Section 1

Section 2

Bottom half

Section 3

Section 4

External links
 Main draw

Stockholm Open
1973 Grand Prix (tennis)